"Hurry Up This Way Again" is a song originally recorded by The Stylistics. It reached #18 in the U.S. R&B chart. The track was written by Cynthia Biggs and Dexter Wansel in 1980. It has been covered by Phyllis Hyman on her album, Forever With You; and sampled in the song, "Politics As Usual" by Jay-Z, on his debut album, Reasonable Doubt.

Other versions have been recorded by Regina Belle, Nick Colionne, Will Downing, Terri Gore, Walter Beasley and Patrice Rushen.

References

1980 singles
Pop ballads
Songs written by Dexter Wansel
Songs written by Cynthia Biggs
1980 songs
The Stylistics songs
Phyllis Hyman songs
Regina Belle songs
Patrice Rushen songs